4-Dimethylamino-4-(p-tolyl)cyclohexanone (sometimes known as dimetamine) is a narcotic analgesic with an arylcyclohexylamine chemical structure. It was developed by Daniel Lednicer at Upjohn in the 1970s. It has around the same analgesic potency as morphine, with analogues where the p-methyl group is replaced by chlorine or bromine being slightly weaker. However derivatives where the ketone group has been reacted with a Grignard reagent to add a phenethyl substitution are several hundred times stronger, and in this series it is the bromo compound BDPC that is the most potent.

Legal Status
4-Dimethylamino-4-(p-tolyl)cyclohexanone is specifically listed as an illegal drug in Latvia. It is also covered by drug analogue laws in various jurisdictions as a generic arylcyclohexylamine derivative.

See also 
 3-HO-PCP
 4-Keto-PCP
 Tramadol

References 

Arylcyclohexylamines
Dimethylamino compounds
Mu-opioid receptor agonists
Synthetic opioids